Top Hat Rendezvous was a 60-minute television variety series which aired on an occasional basis on the BBC from 1951 to 1952. Each episode had a different host, and these included Al Burnett, McDonald Hobley, Derrick de Marney, David Southwood and Clifford Davis.

It is unlikely that any of the episodes still exist, as the series aired live, and the BBC rarely telerecorded shows prior to 1953.

References

External links
Top Hat Rendezvous on IMDb

1950s British television series
1951 British television series debuts
1952 British television series endings
Lost BBC episodes
BBC Television shows
Black-and-white British television shows
British variety television shows